Tenuiphantes tenuis is a species of spider belonging to the family Linyphiidae. Its native distribution is reported as Europe, Macaronesia, Northern Africa, Turkey, Caucasus, Central Asia. The species was introduced to USA, Chile, Argentina and New Zealand from Europe where it is found throughout.

The carapace is dark brown. The abdomen often has a distinctive pattern, usually with clear black spots, and T. tenuis is more slender than other species in the family. The legs are brown and lack annulations.

T. tenuis is usually found in low vegetation, moss, and leaf litter where it feeds on various insects including Listronotus bonariensis.

References

External links

Lepthyphantes tenuis, Spider and Harvestman Recording Scheme website

Linyphiidae
Spiders described in 1852
Spiders of Europe
Spiders of Asia
Spiders of Africa
Spiders of Macaronesia
Taxa named by John Blackwall